The Fifteen Shrines of the Kenmu Restoration (建武中興十五社, Kenmu chūko jūgosha) are a group of Shinto shrines dedicated to individuals and events of the Kenmu Restoration.

References
 Takashi Fujitani, Splendid Monarchy: Power and Pageantry in Modern Japan (Berkeley: University of California Press, 1996).
 John S. Brownlee, Japanese Historians and the National Myths, 1600-1945: The Age of the Gods (UBC Press, 1999).

Historic Sites of Japan
 
Japanese culture-related lists
Lists of Shinto shrines